"Don't Let the Sun Catch You Crying" is a song written by Gerry Marsden, Freddie Marsden, Les Chadwick and Les Maguire, the members of British beat group Gerry and the Pacemakers.  It was first recorded and issued as a single by Louise Cordet in February 1964.  Shortly after Cordet's version failed to chart, the song was recorded by Gerry and The Pacemakers themselves in April 1964.  The Gerry and The Pacemakers recording became an international hit, and remains one of their best known singles.

History
The song was given first to Louise Cordet, a singer who had previously toured with the group as well as with The Beatles.  Her version was produced by Tony Meehan and released on Decca Records in February 1964.  The group then decided to issue their own version. The record, like the group's earlier releases, was produced by George Martin.

It was released in April 1964 as Gerry and the Pacemakers' fifth single in Britain, and spent 11 weeks on the United Kingdom's Record Retailer chart, reaching No. 6.  In the US, it was the breakthrough single for the group, spending 12 weeks on the Billboard Hot 100, reaching No. 4. The song debuted at No. 4 in the first issue of Canada's RPM "Top Forty-5s" chart, while reaching No. 5 on Canada's CHUM Hit Parade, and No. 6 on New Zealand's "Lever Hit Parade".

Cash Box described it as "an extremely pretty soft Latin beat romancer that really grows on you with each listen."

Gerry and the Pacemakers performed the song on their first US television show, The Ed Sullivan Show on 3 May 1964.  The group's earlier UK hit singles - "How Do You Do It?", "I Like It", "You'll Never Walk Alone" and "I'm the One" - were then reissued in the US to follow up its success, but "Don't Let the Sun Catch You Crying" remained their biggest hit in the United States.

Chart history

Weekly charts

Year-end charts

Cover versions
The song has been recorded by many other singers, including Steve Lawrence (1964), José Feliciano (1968), Rickie Lee Jones (1989), Gloria Estefan (1994), Canadian boyband B4-4 (2000), Paul Carrack (2010), Post Image with John Greaves (2011), Nellie McKay (2015), and Ronnie Spector (2016).

References

1964 singles
Gerry and the Pacemakers songs
Song recordings produced by George Martin
Capitol Records singles
1964 songs
Columbia Graphophone Company singles
Songs written by Gerry Marsden